Never Again is a 2001 American comedy film written and directed by Eric Schaeffer. The film stars Jeffrey Tambor, Jill Clayburgh, Caroline Aaron, Bill Duke, Sandy Duncan and Michael McKean. The film was released on July 12, 2002, by USA Films.

Plot

Comedy takes a ribald yet compassionate look at two lovelorn fifty-something New Yorkers. Christopher (Jeffrey Tambor) is an exterminator-cum-jazz musician who, after years of one-night stands, begins to question his sexual orientation. Grace (Jill Clayburgh) is a divorcee looking to jump-start her life again. When a blind date for Grace goes bad, she ducks into a gay bar -- and meets Christopher. The circumstances are so wrong that the two are immediately drawn to each other.

Cast
 Jeffrey Tambor as Christopher
 Jill Clayburgh as Grace
 Caroline Aaron as Elaine
 Bill Duke as Earl
 Sandy Duncan as Natasha
 Michael McKean as Alex, The Transvestite
 Dan'l Linehan as Leather Go-Go Boy
 Bill Weeden as Mr. Speedy
 Eric Axen as Male College Go-Go Boy
 David Bailey as Chad
 Trazana Beverley as Night Nurse 
 Tom Cappadona as The Waiter
 Caitlin Clarke as Allison
 India Cooper as Nurse
 Peter Dinklage as Harry Appleton
 Jenny Kravat as Big Sister
 Kasia Ostlun as College Girl
 Douglas Ladnier as Craig
 Meredith Lauren as The Waitress / Body Double
 Rachel Jéan Marteen as Carrie 
 Melissa Maxwell as Doctor
 Dolores McDougal as Mrs. Feinstein
 Abigail Morgan as Girl #1
 Ebon Moss-Bachrach as Andy
 Jimmy Noonan as The Muscular Waiter 
 Peter Reardon as Runner
 Manuel E. Santiago as Doorman 
 Charlie Schroeder as The Waiter
 Eric Scott as Arthur
 Suzanne Shepherd as Mother
 Edward Steele as Handicapped Man
 Victor Truro as Sex Shop Clerk
 Anne Leighton as Girl #2
 Lily Rabe as Tess

Reception
Never Again received negative reviews from critics. On Rotten Tomatoes, the film has a rating of 31%, based on 61 reviews, with a rating of 4.4/10. The site's critical consensus reads, "The performances are excellent, but much of the story rings false."

References

External links
 

2001 films
2000s English-language films
American comedy films
2001 comedy films
Films directed by Eric Schaeffer
2000s American films